Lugari District was one of the seventy-one districts of Kenya, located in that country's Western Province.  Its capital was Lugari. In 2010, the district was eliminated and incorporated into Kakamega County.

Lugari District had a population of 215,920 and an area of 670 km2 .

Lugari District had one local authority, Lugari county council. The only constituency in the district was Lugari Constituency. The district is divided into three administrative divisions:

 
Former districts of Kenya